Ruprecht, Count Palatine of the Rhine (Pfalzgraf bei Rhein), (14 May 1481, in Heidelberg – 20 August 1504, in Landshut) was the third son of Philip, Elector Palatine of the House of Wittelsbach and he was Bishop of Freising from 1495 to 1498.

Life 

Count Palatine Rupert ruled as bishop elect of the Freising Hochstift from 1495 to 1498, without ever having been consecrated as a priest. He married his first cousin, Elisabeth of Bavaria-Landshut (1478–1504) in 1499, daughter of Duke George the Rich, Duke of Bavaria-Landshut. Rupert was adopted by his father-in-law, and declared the heir of Bavaria-Landshut which led to the outbreak of the Landshut War of Succession after the death of Duke George in 1503. After Elizabeth and Rupert were placed under the imperial ban by Emperor Maximilian on April 23, 1504, they died in quick succession later in 1504 of dysentery. The war ended on July 30, 1505 with the arbitration of Emperor Maximilian I at the Cologne Reichstag. The duchy of Palatinate-Neuburg was created as a compensation for their surviving children Otto Henry and Philip.

Family and Children 

On 10 February 1499 Ruprecht married Elizabeth of Bavaria-Landshut, daughter of George of Bavaria. They had the following four children:
 Twin sons Georg and Ruprecht (November 1500 - August 1504)
 Otto Henry (10 April 1502 – 12 February 1559), Count of Palatinate-Neuburg (1505–1559) and Elector Palatine (1556–1559)
 Philip (12 November 1503 – 4 July 1548), Count of Palatinate-Neuburg (1505–1541)

Ancestors

References 
 

1481 births
1504 deaths
Clergy from Heidelberg
House of Wittelsbach
Counts Palatine of the Holy Roman Empire
Roman Catholic Prince-Bishops of Freising
Adult adoptees
Nobility from Heidelberg
Sons of monarchs